In epidemiology, infectivity is the ability of a pathogen to establish an infection.  More specifically, infectivity is a pathogen's capacity for horizontal transmission — that is, how frequently it spreads among  hosts that are not in a parent–child relationship. The measure of infectivity in a population is called incidence.

Infectivity has been shown to positively correlate with virulence, in plants. This means that as a pathogen's ability to infect a greater number of hosts increases, so does the level of harm it brings to the host.

A pathogen's infectivity is subtly but importantly different from its transmissibility, which refers to a pathogen's capacity to pass from one organism to another.

See also
 Basic reproduction number (basic reproductive rate, basic reproductive ratio, R0, or r nought)

References

Epidemiology